The Sortition Law, officially Law No. 1,860 of 4 January 1908, introduced compulsory military service for the Brazilian Armed Forces. It was approved in 1906 but only de facto implemented in 1916, replacing forced recruitment - the antiquated "blood tribute" - and allowing the constitution of a reserve. Sortition or draft lottery was the mechanism used for recruiting soldiers from 1916 to 1945, when it was replaced by general class call, which is the system of mandatory military service in 21st century-Brazil. Though controversial at the time, the law was one of the major military reforms of the First Brazilian Republic and had lasting effects on the Brazilian Army's relationship with Brazilian politics and society. An earlier law of 1874 had already introduced the lottery, but it was not applied due to popular resistance.

Recruitment reform had been advocated by military officers and politicians since the 19th century. The old system was violent, inefficient and out of the Army's control. As it was characteristic of a weak central power, local oligarchs (coronéis) abused it. Since military service was seen as degrading, there weren't enough volunteers to fill the ranks and the police arrested the "dregs of society" to serve. Reformists saw the military lottery as the most modern and rational form of recruitment. Their reference was Europe, where since the Franco-Prussian War (1870–1871) states had permanent officer corps (and some enlisted men) and variable enlisted personnel; young men served for short periods as soldiers and were sent into a growing reserve, which could be quickly mobilized during war. As in theory all classes should participate, armies would be the "nation in arms" and the "school of nationality", conferring national unity.

A 1906 proposal, drafted by deputy , was finally approved in 1908, with support among officers, the urban middle class and the marshal Hermes da Fonseca's administration at the Ministry of War, during the presidency of Afonso Pena. For military officers who discussed reform of the Army and its poor performance in campaigns, there were clear reasons for reform: to fill in the gaps in the number of troops, form reserves and not fall behind countries like Argentina and Chile, which had already implemented compulsory military service from 1900 onwards. Intellectuals such as Olavo Bilac were more ambitious, seeing in it social leveling and discipline and education of the masses, a "civilizing mission" to be carried out by the officers. The law was controversial and faced opposition from diverse ideological perspectives, such as anarchists, and both in large cities and in the countryside. The labor movement, in particular, made anti-militaristic opposition. Popular opposition, budget cuts and loss of interest from the civilian elite meant that the lottery was not applied immediately.

Only the impact of the First World War and a public relations campaign, with lectures by Olavo Bilac, breathed new life to the law, and the first lottery was held in December 1916. In the following decades, the lottery suffered from administrative limitations and insubmission – thousands were drawn annually, but for years in a row the majority of those called for service did not attend. Contrary to what the law's defenders expected, there was no social leveling, and the lower military ranks continued to be occupied by the lower class. Still, the lottery was successful in attracting recruits, their selection became more judicious and the reputation of soldiers slowly improved. The army's strength grew from 18,000 men in 1915 to 93,000 in 1940, gradually strengthening central power against local oligarchies. The Army reached out to all of society and had a greater capacity to spread its ideology.

Background

Forced recruitment 

The Brazilian Army traces the beginnings of the current compulsory military service to laws created in the hereditary captaincies in the 16th century, but what existed in Colonial Brazil was a mixture of impressment and the feudal militia system. In the beginning, in addition to troops coming from Portugal, settlers were expected to organize their own defenses. Milícias and ordenanças were replaced by the  after Brazil's independence. Service in the National Guard was mandatory among citizens, that is, those who voted and had possessions, and it represented the upper class, unlike the Army, where service was not mandatory.

Soldiers were incorporated by volunteering and, as it was insufficient to fill the ranks, by forced recruitment. The "human hunt" was a violent process, feared by the population, capable of putting workers on the run and damaging local economies; even so, it captured few recruits. The state had a weak bureaucracy and recruitment was under the influence of local elites, with little control by the army. In elections, recruitment was a tool against opponents. Military service was considered a punishment, with harsh discipline and low pay, and soldiers were considered the "scum of society". Still, a precarious social balance kept recruitment under limits. Legal exemptions and a network of patronage protection isolated workers protected by local bosses, restricting service to the unproductive portion of society that deserved punishment in popular morality. As violent and inefficient as it was, the arrangement was accepted enough that the first attempt to replace it with conscription, in 1874, was defeated by popular resistance from the so-called "list rippers".

At the beginning of the First Brazilian Republic, the recruitment pattern of the imperial era remained. Every soldier was theoretically a "volunteer", but it was common for local state police to arrest the "scum of society" on the streets, who were sent to the army and navy barracks. The  punished "vagrancy", "capoeiragem" (the practice of capoeira) and "begging" with imprisonment for a few days, in which prisoners committed themselves to some occupation, such as a military career. In the Navy, in addition to the forced recruitment and enlistment of volunteers, there were the Schools for Apprentice-Sailors. According to officer , in 1913 the Army's main sources of recruitment were refugees from droughts in Northeastern Brazil, criminals and the unemployed or unfit for work, an "inverted selection". Soldiers were frowned upon, and violence and drunkenness were routine in the barracks. The treatment and hygiene were abysmal. Officers maintained discipline by corporal punishment. In the Navy, this resulted in the Revolt of the Lash in 1910.

Model's exhaustion 

The legal frameworks for recruitment were the Regime of Ordinances of 1570, the Royal Charter of 1764 and the Instructions of 10 July 1822. Officers had wanted recruitment reform since the 1840s, and legislators had rhetoric against the system, but until the 1870s there was no reform. A first lottery law was introduced in 1827. In 1834–1835, the lottery proposal was amended to become just a set of bounties for volunteers. Recruitment reform projects were aborted in 1831, 1839, 1845, 1850, 1858, 1863, and 1866. Partial reforms took place in 1842, 1845, 1847, and 1850, without addressing forced recruitment.

Forced recruitment was far from the European ideal to which Brazilian elites aspired. Mandatory military service had been a pillar of European armies since the French Revolution, and inspired by it, the 1824 Brazilian Constitution charged everyone with the defense of the State. After the Franco-Prussian War (1870–1871) European countries, with the exception of the United Kingdom, adopted the model of general conscription, service for 1–3 years and a reserve for wartime mobilization, inspired by Prussia, whose conscription system was considered essential to its victory. Nation-states carried out structural reforms, each increasingly controlling their populations. Their armies grew in the "armed peace" of the following decades, based on increasing literacy, industrialization and railroad networks. Mandatory military service would also be a way of instilling the idea of ​​the nation, a "school of nationality" where men from all social backgrounds would serve and gain a sense of national unity.

Brazil, on the other hand, had a pre-industrial economy and society, with an almost non-existent state for the majority of the population, but the young officialdom demanded change. There was no reserve force, and it was difficult to quickly expand the army in time of need. Soldier shortages were a chronic problem, and officers wanted better-quality manpower. The Paraguayan War evidenced the exhaustion of the model. The much greater demand for soldiers during the war overwhelmed the social arrangement of recruitment, and the conduct of the war was delayed due to the inefficiency of mobilization.

1874 reform attempt 
Reform of the military service was discussed again from 1866 onwards. The consensus was to end forced recruitment. In its place, Europe offered three models: in the United Kingdom, volunteering for ten years, supplemented by militias, in Prussia, conscription of all eligible men for a short time, followed by enlistment in a reserve, and in France, the sortition of some men for seven years of service. Parliamentarians did not accept what they called conscription, the recruitment of entire classes, as in Prussia. Some in the Liberal Party defended volunteering, while others in the Conservative Party, associated with part of the high officialdom, wanted the French model. The lottery won and was made law in 1874. It was more reminiscent of the French laws of 1818 and 1832, with extensive exemptions, than the universal military service implemented in France after its defeat against Prussia.

The new legislation was Law No. 2,556 of 26 September 1874 and the Decree 5,881 of 17 February 1875. If volunteers were lacking, the first lottery would call up free men aged 19 to 30 for six years of service. Subsequent lotteries, held annually, would choose between 19-year-old men. The rich would have as escapes the personal or pecuniary substitution (in peacetime) and the exemptions. Still, the number of exemptions declined. To make the service more attractive, discipline and hierarchical distinctions were softened. Seen by reformers as an institutional advance, the law was supposed to distribute the military burden more rationally and equitably through a blind lottery. It would end the abuses of forced recruitment, increase the quality of recruits, make military service an honorable duty, and implement a modern reserve system.

To the surprise of its creators, there was opposition from almost all social classes. The equality of the lottery was not seen as fair by the workers benefiting from the protection of patrons, and those who carried out the lot were not trusted. If, for the poor, the law tightened the burden, for landowners it intensified competition with the military for access to workers. In 1875, when work on the enlistment was due to begin, it was interrupted by crowds of "list rippers" in ten provinces in Southeastern and Northeastern Brazil. The revolt had a peasant character, though supported by local elites, and had outstanding female participation, with women defending their husbands and families; the new law did not include the traditional exemption for married men. The state backed off, postponing the lottery indefinitely, and the status quo of forced recruitment was maintained.

The 1908 Sortition Law

Approval context 

The military ideology after the Proclamation of the Republic in 1889 was of the Army as the "armed people". The  determined that soldiers in the Army and Navy would be volunteers, or, failing that, drawn by lottery. Thus, mandatory military service was determined, but its application had not been regulated. The High Command saw compulsory military service as indispensable, and each year the Ministry of War reports emphasized its need. Reforms were made possible by the internal consolidation of the Republic, poor performance in campaigns such as the War of Canudos, and international tensions such as the Acre Issue and the naval arms race with Argentina and Chile.

In 1906, federal deputy Alcindo Guanabara presented a new draft law on the lottery. Some parliamentarians questioned its constitutionality, but 15 months later, on 4 January 1908, it was approved. Enlistment boards in the municipalities would annually census all men aged 20 to 28 years. The lotteries would be held annually. Annual batches of recruits would be turned into soldiers and sent to the reserve. The permanent elements of the Army would be empowered to instruct this continuous flow, preparing the nation for future wars.

Hermes da Fonseca's reforms revolved around mandatory military service. It was needed for the new divisional organization that was intended to be created. The military districts into which Brazil's territory was divided were replaced by thirteen permanent inspection regions, responsible for filling the ranks. Both districts and regions would correspond to army divisions. Only in the "Hermes Reform", in 1908, did the Army start to have large permanent units, such as brigades; its structure until then was rudimentary.

The so-called linhas de tiro (shooting ranges), precursors of the Tiros de Guerra, publicized the project and helped propel its approval. Considered more pleasant than the barracks by civilians, they would be a reserve for the Army, where youths would receive paramilitary training in weapons and discipline. It was an alternative to military service, taking place in organizations other than traditional ones. In 1906, existing shooting range institutions were merged into the Brazilian Shooting Confederation. The shooting rangers were elitist, and shooters from the Tiros de Guerra, volunteer participants in Army maneuvers and students from schools with military training were exempt from the lottery. The Tiros de Guerra were thus a way for the middle and upper classes not to serve in the Army. The union of ten shooting clubs of the Federal District in 1908 constituted the first organized reserve of the Army. 300 maneuver volunteers were incorporated, some from high society. In the same year, a first civilian college adopted military instruction. Interest in a reserve was also one of the reasons for the Army's efforts to control the Forças Públicas (state-controlled military forces) and the National Guard.

Initial failure 

Government pressure and enthusiastic support from the middle class allowed the law to be approved. The urban middle class, which made up the officer corps and had an increasing similarity of ideas, intended to strengthen the Army against coronelism. Enthusiasm was not unanimous. Supported by officers, intellectuals and capitalists, the law was unwanted among workers. Military service was until then compared to slavery and lower ranks were not valued, although the law sought to change their reputation. The mood of nationalist euphoria was not shared by all of society. Opposition demonstrations took place both in large cities and in the countryside. In Minas Gerais, a powerful state averse to military service, the first attempt at enlistment in 1908 had violent reactions. In Sacramento, 200 women destroyed enlistment records; another attack took place in Uberaba. In Mar de Espanha and Carangola, board members were murdered. In Vila da Abadia there was a mass flight of the population. There were several other incidents of resistance.

After the law was passed, budget cuts reduced the army's strength to a level staffed only with volunteers, and there was no lottery. Enlistment boards were put in place for the future lottery, but slowly. In Minas Gerais, only ten of the 178 municipalities had boards in 1912. With incomplete lists, it was not possible to carry out the lottery. The Sortition Law was associated with the marshal. Hermes won the election, but in his tenure (1910–1914) the  discredited the Army, further delaying mandatory military service. An initial surge of enthusiasm for shooting societies was lost because the law wasn't applied, and membership only began to grow again after 1916. Personnel demand continued to be met by volunteering and forced recruitment until 1916.

The law's controversies

Support 

The officers' consensus on the law was that it should fill in the gaps in the ranks, generalize military training, and form a deployable reserve. Armies throughout South America were undergoing modernizations, and Brazilian officers looked with concern at their country's backwardness. Chile and Argentina had already adopted compulsory military service, respectively in 1900 and 1901. In the same period (1900–1912) it was also adopted by Ecuador, Colombia, Bolivia and Peru. In the Navy, the problem of lack of personnel had already been remedied with the old instruments; there was a shortage of enlisted men until the end of the 1900s, but by 1914 94% of the National Marine Corps personnel ranks had been filled.

While the military usefulness of conscription was clear, ideological perspectives on it were diverse, and intellectuals were more ambitious than officers. It was associated with the contemporary conception of modernity and rationality, transforming the nation in the likes of countries considered more advanced; "an example, a reference for the literate avant-gardes of the time, a symbol of modernity, civilization and progress". Civilian and military republican leaders saw the possibility of modernizing the bureaucratic apparatus of the state and breaking the local clientelism that made recruitment difficult. These local powers (rural coronelism) intimidated voters with the threat of impressment, and thus they opposed the lottery.

Intellectuals, notably Olavo Bilac, saw an educational and disciplining potential of compulsory military service on the masses. The Armed Forces would serve as an alternative to the limited-reach education system in transforming the population, which they saw as ignorant, manipulated and lacking a sense of nationality. The recruits would leave the barracks as citizens instilled with the values ​​of intellectuals. This "civilizing mission" would be conducted by the officers, who would become "civic priests", teachers of the soldiers-students. Bilac stressed that militarization would be against an external invader, not offensive, and the "citizen soldier" would be a militarized civilian and not a member of a military caste interfering in politics. The scope of the lottery would be universal, giving a sense of civic and national unity to countrymen from the interior and children of former slaves and immigrants. If, on the one hand, the disciplinary effect would be for the lower class, on the other hand middle and upper classes were also expected to serve, and Bilac even scandalized them with his insistence on the immediate application of the law. During the project's discussion, Alcindo Guanabara spoke that the lottery would be for all social classes, and the opposition came from the bourgeoisie that did not want their children to serve. For him, "the new Army will not be a prison, a place of torture, it will not be a branch of the Dantean Inferno". According to Olavo Bilac:

Criticism 

Alberto Torres, like Olavo Bilac, an influential intellectual for the military, was against compulsory military service. For Torres, military training would not transmit civic virtues; soldiers would only be virtuous if they had been virtuous before; "civic character, morality, feelings of altruism and sympathy have only found adulteration in the barracks until today. The good soldier takes them from home and from the public squares to the barracks. The barracks, not being able to create such qualities, does not, therefore, make good soldiers for our time: it makes praetorians (...)" Instead, compulsory military service would be undemocratic, transforming permanent officers into a caste above the people and engaged in politics.

The newspapers Correio da Manhã,  and  called the law bellicose and anti-individualist. The satirical magazine O Malho published numerous criticisms and ironies. The civic discourse of Bilac and his supporters was satirized by the popular poet . For the Associação dos Empregados no Comercio do Rio de Janeiro (AECRJ), the law violated liberal principles and individual freedom in regards to the State and disorganized the working classes. The , based on the theories of Auguste Comte, saw no future for militarization in social evolution.

The main opposition to the lottery, however, came from the labor movement. The First Brazilian Workers' Congress, in 1906, already had an anti-militarist ideology. Reception to the new law was hostile in 1908; for the workers' representatives, among them anarchist leaders, militarism and war were only in the interests of capitalists. The Brazilian Workers Confederation had an anti-militarist and anti-capitalist discourse in its demonstrations and in its newspaper A Voz do Trabalhador, calling for resistance to the law. In January 1908 the Brazilian Antimilitarist League was founded. According to its program, the Army “serves to keep the working class in its place, and serves as a strikebreaker”, “[it] represents a barbaric past, and for this reason it opposes the ideals of individual freedom, freedom of choice of professions and respect for the person”; “The Fatherland, in the name of which the Army is created to defend, does not represent the interests of all citizens, but only of the capitalists”, and the lottery “is the return of slavery and is unconstitutional”. Repressed by the authorities, the movement failed to prevent the implementation of the law.

One of the central controversies, first raised by the workers, was the effect of compulsory military service on the family. For the opponents, men would not be able to start a family and mothers would lose their children to the degrading environment of the barracks; the manifesto of the Antimilitarist League warned mothers that the Armed Forces were dens of criminals and their children would be treated the same as them. Defenders reacted by describing the barracks as an extension of the family. For many Brazilian men, military service did not represent virility but a threat to their masculinity. In the dark humor of the time, the conscripts were mocked as "cuckolds". Like mandatory vaccination, which had resulted in the Vaccine Revolt in 1904, mandatory military service was seen as a violation of domestic privacy. In both cases, the opponents of the state were similar—trade unionists, Jacobins (radical republicans), orthodox positivists, monarchists and some influential politicians. In turn, lottery advocates used the rhetoric of hygiene, which was persuasive as prophylaxis was eradicating yellow fever, smallpox and other diseases in cities.

Another point, raised by the AECRJ and the Antimilitarist League, was that military service would privilege immigrants over Brazilians in the labor market. However, the large number of immigrants in the factories drove precisely the unions and leagues against compulsory military service. For its defenders, the children of immigrants would be one of the groups to be integrated into the national community through the service.

The first lottery 

The outbreak of the First World War (1914–1918), with the immense material mobilization and destruction suffered by the belligerents, impressed Brazilian observers and motivated the discussion on national defense, including a new impetus to the effort to implement the Sortition Law. In the era of total war, in which entire populations were mobilized, the Brazilian model was obsolete.

The formation of a reserve force was a cause shared by the editors of the periodical  and general , Minister of War during the government of Venceslau Brás. In his order of battle reform, Faria replaced the Hermes Reform brigades with army divisions capable of incorporating reservists without creating new units. Olavo Bilac was the spokesperson. In his “nationalist apostolate” from 1915 to 1916, he lectured to students, intellectuals and military officers in São Paulo, Rio de Janeiro, Belo Horizonte, Curitiba and Porto Alegre. The population was more concerned about public health and the assimilation of immigrants, issues associated with mandatory military service. Political opponents were no longer an obstruction: Senator Ruy Barbosa was enthusiastic about Brazil's entry in World War I, and senator Pinheiro Machado, leader of a coalition of rural coronéis, was assassinated in 1915. The press began to write in favor of the lottery.

Finally, on 10 December 1916, almost nine years after the law was passed, the first lottery was held at the Army Headquarters in a ceremony open to the public, with the presence of the President of the Republic, the Minister of War, Olavo Bilac and other authorities. By rotating a globe, with numbered balls, 152 names were drawn for the first group. The Supreme Federal Court denied some requests for habeas corpus, thus ruling on the constitutionality of the law. The Catholic Church also expressed its approval.

Summoned and unsubmissive men 
The lottery underpinned the physical expansion of the Army. The force had 18,000 men in 1915, within the 15,000 to 20,000 men range that it had fluctuated in the previous century since the 1830s. As the cost of transporting soldiers over long distances was high, training took place in the soldiers' home regions, and thus, a first wave of expansion, at the time of the country's entry into World War I, sought greater geographical extension. Manpower growth kept its momentum. According to Minister of War Eurico Gaspar Dutra, the force reached 50 thousand men in 1930 and 93 thousand in 1940. Even so, Brazil still had a low number of soldiers per capita.

The expansion took place despite the system not working exactly as intended. Its proponents felt failure. A huge number of unsubmissives did not respond to the summons. In 1925, 82% of those summoned by the  did not attend, and of the remaining, 17% were physically incapable. Only 6% of those summoned were used. Commercial and industrial institutions did not provide lists of employees. Birth and death records were deficient, and some of those called for service did not even know it; notification through the Post Office was flawed. In that case, it was normal to be acquitted in court. Punishing the unyielding was difficult. Many did not attend due to refusal. Recruitment continued to be conducted with partiality, and it was used as a weapon in political struggles in the countryside. Poor hygiene and food conditions, low salaries and the weakness of the Army's infrastructure kept the population's rejection to military service. Such conditions spawned anti-militarist reservists. The population's passive resistance increased in the mid-1920s, when the army was discredited by the revolts of the tenentes. In 1928, half of the enlisted men were volunteers, not drawn by lottery.

The Army could now be more judicious with recruits and ward off ex-convicts, beggars, vagrants, and illiterates. Its modernization required a higher technical level of the enlisted. They served closer to home and were more urban than the average population, as civil registration was less complete in rural areas. In the medical records of 1922–1923 the recruits were mostly agricultural workers, factory workers and trade employees. Due to the country's sanitary state, many were physically unfit. Physical punishment, considered inadmissible for young men drawn, was suppressed, but violence did not completely disappear from the routine.

Contrary to what advocates of compulsory military service expected, there was no socioeconomic leveling and the soldiers continued to be of lower classes. With good connections, a healthy young man could be considered unfit for service on physical examination.

Developments in legislation 
New legislation later emerged for military service. The 1908 law was amended in 1918, a regulation was created by decree in 1923, and a new law on military service was passed in 1939. Despite patriotic appeals, only punitive measures resolved insubmission. A 1933 decree required a certificate of military service for holding public office. The requirement for this document became universal, and new legal provisions emerged to enforce the lottery. From 1945 onwards, all young men had the obligation to present themselves, under penalty of not being able to obtain an identity card or passport, hold public office or “claim the recognition of any right, favor or prerogative based on labor laws”.

Even in 1940, the minister of War considered the lottery indispensable, as there wasn't enough patriotic will to serve. In addition to punitive measures, real improvements in working conditions and the advance of official rhetoric slowly dispelled the idea that military service was a punishment. Desertion and violent criminality in the ranks declined after 1916. In World War II, enlisted personnel numbers grew to 153,158 in 1944; the lottery proved capable of mobilizing a large force. The Brazilian Expeditionary Force (1943–1945) was meant to be a vplunteer force. As volunteers were insufficient, it was completed with a selection of the best possible conscripts. The prestige of the pracinhas, as the soldiers of Expeditionary Force were called, confirmed the change in soldiers' reputation.

The lottery had been in force from 1916 to 1945; from then on, the form of recruitment was the general convoking of the class, still in force in the 21st century. All classes of a certain age attend the recruitment process, and the authorities choose from among them the young men who will serve.

Consequences

For the military career 
Mandatory military service changed the paradigm of a professional army to that of a "nation in arms". The professional soldier (only professional in the sense that he stayed many years in the barracks) was no longer desired. Until then, soldiers served until expulsion or end of career. The term of service was three years in 1891, but soldiers could renew their re-engagement up to 20 years of service. Incorporated soldiers were of different ages and arrived in small numbers throughout the year. NCOs (corporals, sergeants, and warrant officers) came from the ranks of soldiers, and some of the officers were soldiers that had been promoted.

With the lottery, personnel were divided into a permanent element, mainly of career officers and secondarily of permanent praças (soldiers and NCOs), and a variable one of enlisted men who returned to civilian life after a short period of service. Recruits were young and arrived simultaneously, facilitating socialization into the military. Volunteers or draftees served for periods of two years, after which they could then re-engage under certain conditions, and remained in the reserve after serving on active duty. The figure of the professional soldier did not disappear completely, as the Army needed a core of experienced soldiers and there were now instructor sergeants. Alongside the concept of the "nation in arms", there was the elitist project of professionalizing the officer corps. The access of praças to the officership was gradually reduced, especially during the Estado Novo.

For the Armed Forces 
The Sortition Law was one of the milestones in the transformation of the Brazilian Army at the beginning of the Republic, with important institutional and political effects. Along with other measures, such as the training of reserve officers (in which the upper class participated), there was a new model of military organization. The Army was no longer closed in on itself, taking in some recruits from the outside without returning them to civilian life, but it now had multiple channels of entry and exit and could influence society by training and socializing the reservists. The rebel tenentes of the 1920s gained a sociological justification for the "citizen-soldier" idea, as they could now argue that the force represented the people. The civic mission of compulsory military service was embraced throughout the 20th century by the officers as one of the institution's functions. The "Party in Uniform” became stronger and more engaged in politics and had a greater ability to impose its ideology on society.

The Army's relationship with society was altered, introducing it to the private sphere of the family and to the most remote parts of Brazil. The development of its bureaucratic structure from the late 1910s onwards allowed it to reach individuals hitherto invisible to the State. The numbers grew gradually, causing "a slow and silent process of accumulation of political capital by the Army and, by extension, the central power, to the detriment of local and regional plutocracies". At the national level, this ended up allowing the Estado Novo. The State took the place of local coronéis as patron of the honorable poor. The inclusion of a greater proportion of the population in the military legitimized the social programs and the more inclusive electoral politics of populism, at the same time as the military gained sufficient strength to exercise authoritarian power.

See also 

 Reorganization of the Brazilian Army in the Old Republic
 Draft lottery in the United States

Notes

References

Citations

Bibliography

External links 

 

Brazilian legislation
First Brazilian Republic
Military history of Brazil